Anabel Medina Garrigues was the defending champion, but retired in the second round against Kristina Barrois.

Aravane Rezaï won the title, defeating Lucie Hradecká in the final 7–6(7–2), 6–1.

Seeds

  Anabel Medina Garrigues (second round, retired due to a lower back injury)
  Sybille Bammer (first round)
  Peng Shuai (quarterfinals)
  Gisela Dulko (second round)
  Tamarine Tanasugarn (first round)
  Elena Vesnina (first round)
  Anna-Lena Grönefeld (first round)
  Nathalie Dechy (first round)

Draw

Finals

Top half

Bottom half

References

External links
Main draw
Qualifying draw

Internationaux de Strasbourg - Singles
Internationaux de Strasbourg
2009 in French tennis